Rakat may refer to:
 Rakat-e Olya, a village in Iran
 Rakat-e Sofla, a village in Iran